Francis Reynolds McGurk (15 January 1909 – 2 March 1978) was a Scotland international footballer who played in the Scottish Football League for Clyde and made 22 appearances in the English Football League playing for Birmingham and Bristol City. He played as an outside right.

McGurk was born in Eddlewood, Hamilton. He began his football career with junior club Blantyre Celtic before joining Clyde of the Scottish Football League First Division in 1931. He made a name for himself as a goalscorer, and in the 1933 close season moved to England to join Football League First Division side Birmingham. Though he showed no signs of enhancing his goalscoring reputation, his dribbling attracted the attention of the Scotland national selectors. After only two years as a professional, McGurk won his first and only international cap, on 4 October 1933, in a 3–2 defeat to Wales at Ninian Park in the British Home Championship. After two years with Birmingham, in which time he played only 19 games, McGurk left for Bristol City, and a few months after that he was playing in the Birmingham Works League for Whittaker Ellis.

McGurk died in Birmingham in 1978 at the age of 69.

References

External links
 
 McGurk's profile at London Hearts Supporters Club

1909 births
1978 deaths
Scottish footballers
Scotland international footballers
Association football outside forwards
Clyde F.C. players
Birmingham City F.C. players
Bristol City F.C. players
Scottish Football League players
Scottish Junior Football Association players
English Football League players
Blantyre Celtic F.C. players
Footballers from Hamilton, South Lanarkshire